Andrew Christopher Quarless (born October 6, 1988) is a former American football tight end. He played college football at Penn State. Quarless was drafted by the Green Bay Packers in the fifth round of the 2010 NFL Draft and later won Super Bowl XLV with them over the Pittsburgh Steelers. He has also been a member of the Detroit Lions.

Early years
Quarless attended Turtle Hook Junior High School in Uniondale, New York, then received a scholarship to Holy Trinity High School on Long Island until his junior year when he transferred to Uniondale High School. It was there that he had his greatest season before entering Penn State. After winning the Super Bowl he returned to Uniondale, where he was honored by Uniondale Ave being renamed "Andrew Quarless Way".

College career
Quarless had a breakout season as a true freshman in 2006. He was pushed into Joe Paterno in a game against Wisconsin, which broke Paterno's leg. Success in the 2007 season was limited due to suspensions and loss of his starting position at tight end to Mickey Shuler, Jr. Quarless saw limited playing time in 2008 until the Illinois game when he started in the place of an injured Shuler and caught a key 4th-quarter touchdown. He made the game-winning catch in the 2010 East-West Shrine Game.

Professional career

Green Bay Packers

Quarless was selected in the fifth round (154th overall) by the Green Bay Packers in the 2010 NFL Draft. On July 12, 2010, he signed a contract with the Packers. Quarless scored his first NFL career touchdown against the Minnesota Vikings. In the 2010 regular season, he had picked up 238 yards. He had 21 receptions averaging 11.3 yards per catch. At the end of the 2010 season, Quarless and the Packers appeared in Super Bowl XLV against the Pittsburgh Steelers. He had one reception for five yards in the game. In 2011, he had three receptions for 36 yards and was the primary backup to Jermichael Finley. His role was a blocker. He suffered a season-ending knee injury in a 4th quarter kickoff return in the 38-35 win against the New York Giants on Sunday December 4, 2011. On December 7, 2011, Quarless was placed on injured reserve. He was placed on reserve/physically unable to perform on August 27, 2012. On November 7, 2012, Quarless was activated from reserve/physically unable to perform. He was placed on injured reserve on December 1, 2012. On March 13, 2014, Quarless was re-signed by the Packers. He was placed on injured reserve – designated for return on September 30, 2015. On December 21, 2015, Quarless was activated from injured reserve – designated for return. He was placed on injured reserve on January 15, 2016.

Detroit Lions
On August 15, 2016, Quarless was signed by the Detroit Lions. He was released on September 19, 2016.

Statistics
Source: NFL.com

The "Macho Gun Incident"
On July 4, 2015, Quarless was arrested and charged with discharging a firearm in public in Miami Beach. Miami Beach Police were called by a parking attendant who witnessed Quarless' dispute and the firearm discharge who reported that Quarless and Michael Ritchie approached a white car filled with women. The attendant heard the women yell, "No! Get away! Leave me alone!"

Quarless then took out a semiautomatic handgun and fired two shots. One woman felt that Quarless did this "in an attempt to emphasize his dominance and manhood." Quarless was discovered by police, along with his handgun, attempting to hide in bushes in front of a nearby tavern. Bullets found at the scene of the crime matched the gun Quarless was found with.

On August 12, 2016, he was suspended by the NFL for the first two games of the 2016 season for violating the league's personal conduct policy.

References

External links

 
 
 
 

1988 births
Living people
Sportspeople from Brooklyn
Players of American football from New York City
American football tight ends
Penn State Nittany Lions football players
Green Bay Packers players
Detroit Lions players